Scoturopsis franclemonti is a moth of the family Notodontidae. It is found in the eastern Andes of southern Peru.

The length of the forewings is 11-11.5 mm for males. The ground color of the forewings is rich, dark chocolate brown with a clearly defined, light yellow-orange dash. The central area of the hindwings is broadly yellow-orange, while the outer margin is broadly banded with dark chocolate brown and the anal margin is broadly light brown, with, inside the edge of the band, a mixture of yellow-orange and brown scales.

Etymology
The species is named in honor of John G. Franclemont.

References

Moths described in 2008
Notodontidae of South America